The list of ship launches in 1931 includes a chronological list of ships launched in 1931.

References

Sources

 

 

1931
Ship launches